In the Eurovision Song Contest 1968, Sweden was represented by Claes-Göran Hederström with the song "Det börjar verka kärlek, banne mig", written and composed by Peter Himmelstrand. It finished 5th (out of 17) with 15 points, including 6 from Norway, the highest number of votes awarded that year.

Before Eurovision

Melodifestivalen 1968 
Melodifestivalen 1968 was the selection for the 10th song to represent Sweden at the Eurovision Song Contest. It was the ninth time that this system of picking a song had been used. 2233 songs were submitted to SVT for the competition. The final was held in the Cirkus in Stockholm on 9 March 1968, hosted by Magnus Banck and was broadcast on Sveriges Radio TV but was not broadcast on radio.

At Eurovision

Voting

References

External links
ESCSweden.com (in Swedish)
Information site about Melodifestivalen
Eurovision Song Contest National Finals

1968
Countries in the Eurovision Song Contest 1968
1968
Eurovision
Eurovision